Huguenot railway station is the main passenger railway station in the town of Paarl, Western Cape, South Africa. It is served by Metrorail commuter trains on the Northern Line. It is also the second stop out of Cape Town for Shosholoza Meyl inter-city trains originating or terminating there.

Although there is a railway station bearing the name of "Paarl", it is located in an industrial area in the southern part of Paarl, and express and inter-city trains do not stop there.

Huguenot station has three tracks for passenger trains, accessed by a side platform and an island platform connected by a pedestrian bridge and subway.

Services

Shosholoza Meyl stations
Metrorail Western Cape stations
Paarl
Railway stations in the Western Cape